General Anil Chauhan  (born 18 May 1961) is a four-star general of the Indian Army, who is the current and 2nd Chief of Defence Staff (CDS) of the Indian Armed Forces, since 30 September 2022.

On 28 September 2022, Chauhan was recalled from retirement and was appointed Chief of Defence Staff (CDS) by the Narendra Modi-led government, following a June 2022 notification which permitted military retirees under the age of 62 to be qualified for the post. Assuming charge two days later, he became the first three-star retiree to be appointed to the post, traditionally held by a four-star officer. He succeeded General Bipin Rawat, the inaugural holder of the post, who had died nine months earlier in a helicopter crash in December 2021.

Early life
Chauhan was born in a Hindu Garhwali Rajput family of Chauhan clan on 18 May 1961, hailing from the Pauri Garhwal district, Uttarakhand. After completing his schooling at Kendriya Vidyalaya at Fort William, Kolkata, he joined the National Defence Academy, Khadakwasla (NDA) as part of the 58 Course in year. He subsequently joined to the Indian Military Academy, Dehradun (IMA) as part of the 68 Course in 1980.

Career
After graduating from the IMA in June 1981, Chauhan was commissioned as a second lieutenant into the 6th Battalion of the 11th Gorkha Rifles (6/11 GR).

As a major general, he commanded the Baramulla-based 19th Infantry Division of the Northern Command. In 2017, on promotion to the rank of lieutenant general, he was appointed General officer commanding of the Dimapur-based III Corps. In January 2018, he was appointed Director General Military Operations (DGMO), during the course of which he oversaw the execution of two key military operations: the 2019 retaliatory airstrikes against Pakistan and Operation Sunrise - a joint India-Myanmar counter-insurgency offensive.

In September 2019, Chauhan was appointed as the General Officer Commanding-in-Chief (GOC-in-C) of the Eastern Command upon the elevation of his predecessor, Lieutenant General Manoj Mukund Naravane, as Vice Chief of Army Staff. Following his retirement from active military service, General Chauhan served as a military advisor to the National Security Council Secretariat (NSCS), headed by Ajit Doval, India's fifth National Security Advisor. After a 21-month tenure, Chauhan relinquished charge, handing over to Lieutenant General Manoj Pande, and superannuated on 31 May 2021.

Return to military service

Chief of Defence Staff

On 8 December 2021, Gen. Bipin Rawat, the inaugural Chief of Defence Staff (CDS), died when his Mil Mi-17 helicopter carrying him and 13 others, crashed in Coonoor, Tamil Nadu. Gen Rawat, who had only been in the post for twenty-three months, had no immediate successor to him, as the position of CDS had no defined order of succession, which led to it becoming vacant. Amidst growing uncertainty over the impending choice of appointing a successor, the Union Government appointed Gen. Manoj Mukund Naravane, the then-Chief of the Army Staff (COAS), as an acting functionary to the position of Chairman Chiefs of Staff Committee (Chairman COSC), as an interim successor in an effort to temporarily oversee Gen Rawat's responsibilities, while simultaneously looking for an apt successor. Gen Naravane, then the senior most chief amongst the three branches of the armed forces, was himself reported to be a plausible successor; however, his retirement in April 2022 put an end to those speculations.

In June 2022, the Ministry of Defence (MoD) issued a gazette notification, which stated that any three-star officer under the age of 62 - lieutenant general, vice admiral or air marshal, whether serving or retired, would be considered qualified candidates eligible to appointed as CDS. The notification subsequently made Gen Chauhan, who had already retired as a lieutenant general at the age of 60, one of the key frontrunners in the pool of qualified candidates. Around the time of the notification's release, Gen Chauhan was one of 14 candidates from the army, comprising both serving and retired commanders, who were eligible for the position.

On 28 September 2022, the MoD released an official statement announcing that Gen Chauhan had been selected as the new CDS, which subsequently concluded the position's nine-month vacancy.

Personal life
General Chauhan is married to Anupama, an artist. The couple have a daughter, Pragya.  An art enthusiast, Gen Chauhan is a keen admirer of Tibetan art, a fact which he attributed to his wife. As a general officer and later as CDS, Gen Chauhan's life bore several similarities to Gen Rawat's; both men were commissioned in the same regiment, the 11th Gorkha Rifles and also hailed from the same ancestral region, the Pauri Garhwal district. As fellow officers, Gen Rawat was said to have held Gen Chauhan with high esteem; in 2022, when a military garrison along the Line of Actual Control was renamed after him, Gen Chauhan was amongst the dignitaries present at the renaming ceremony. Chauhan is also said to be close with Ajit Doval, with whom he had closely worked with during his retirement.

Apart from his service in the military, Gen Chauhan authored two books: Aftermath of A Nuclear Attack - an analytic detailing the effects of a nuclear fallout, which was published in 2010 and History of 11 Gorkha Rifles Regimental Centre, a chronicle of the regiment he wrote during his stint as its commander. According to Chauhan's known acquaintances, he is reputed to be an steady golfer and an ardent collector of masks.

Honours and decorations 
Over the span of his military career of four decades, Gen Chauhan received numerous military decorations. He was awarded the Vishisht Seva Medal in 2011, the Sena Medal in 2014, the Ati Vishisht Seva Medal in 2015, the Uttam Yudh Seva Medal in 2018, and the Param Vishisht Seva Medal in 2020.

Dates of rank

References 

Living people
Indian generals
Indian Army officers
National Defence Academy (India) alumni
Recipients of the Param Vishisht Seva Medal
Recipients of the Uttam Yudh Seva Medal
Recipients of the Ati Vishisht Seva Medal
Recipients of the Sena Medal
Recipients of the Vishisht Seva Medal
People from Uttarakhand
Garhwali people
Military personnel from Uttarakhand
Chiefs of Defence Staff (India)
People from Pauri Garhwal district
1961 births
National Defence College, India alumni